Dharam Singh Chhoker is an Indian politician. He was elected to the Haryana Legislative Assembly from Samalkha as a legislator in the 2019 Haryana Legislative Assembly election as a candidate of the Indian National Congress.

References

1964 births
Living people
People from Panipat district
Haryana MLAs 2019–2024
Indian National Congress politicians from Haryana